Cormar Carpet Company is a British manufacturer of tufted carpet based in Greater Manchester. It produces and distributes over 15 million sq metres of primarily residential carpet per annum, from its three sites - Holme Mill and Brookhouse Mill in the Bury area and a regional distribution centre in Hemel Hempstead. Turnover in 2018 was £129m, ranking Cormar as one of the largest tufted carpet manufacturers in the UK by volume and value.

Cormar is privately owned and employs over 280 people. It owns its transport fleet of over 70 vehicles and supplies to flooring retailers, wholesalers and contractors throughout Great Britain and Ireland.

Formerly known as Greenwood & Coope (originally a textiles accessory supply business started in 1924), Cormar Carpets was set up by the late Neville Cormack O.B.E, - one of the first companies to start producing tufted carpet in  Britain in 1956 at Nunn Hill Mills in the Rossendale Valley, Lancashire. It moved to Brookhouse Mill in Greenmount in 1959 and a second mill, Holme Mill in Ramsbottom, was purchased via the acquisition of Holmebury Carpets in 1973. Cormar continues to produce all its easy-clean, soft deep-pile, wool twist and wool loop carpets at these two mills. In 2018, Cormar opened a new, purpose-built 130,000 sq ft regional distribution centre in Hemel Hempstead to service the south and central areas of England and Wales.

External links

British rugs and carpets
Companies based in the Metropolitan Borough of Bury
Carpet manufacturing companies
Textile manufacturers of England